The Jan Dlugosz University in Czestochowa [JDU; ] is a public university located in Częstochowa, in the Silesian Voivodeship of Poland.  Founded in 1971 as a teacher training college, it was transformed into a higher teacher education school in 1974 with two faculties, the Faculty of Mathematics and Natural Sciences, and the Faculty of Pedagogy.  Now the academy comprises two other faculties, the Faculty of Philosophy and History, and the Faculty of Art Education, some inter-faculty teaching centres for Foreign Language Area Studies, physical education and sports, and approximately 10,000 students and about 800 academic staff members.

The academy participates to the Erasmus Programme (EuRopean Community Action Scheme for the Mobility of University Students), a European Union (EU) student exchange programme established in 1987, a major part of the EU Lifelong Learning Programme 2007–2013, and is the operational framework for the European Commission's initiatives in higher education.

Affiliations

Lifelong Learning Program ERASMUS
The Jan Długosz University was s part of the Lifelong Learning Programme 2007–2013.

Doctors Honoris causa 
 Henryk Samsonowicz,
 Jerzy Strzelczyk,
 Gerhard Fieguth,
 Marian Kisiel,
 Andrzej Jan Zakrzewski.

Notable alumni
 Andrzej Biernat – a Polish politician and a member of the Civic Platform party;
 Jakub Błaszczykowski – a Polish professional footballer;
 Maciej Ganczar – a Polish literary scholar specializing in German literature, literary translator;
 Wioletta Grzegorzewska – a Polish poet and writer;
 Tomasz Lubaszka – a Polish painter;
 Jacek Magiera – a Polish football manager and former footballer
 Radosław Panas – a Polish volleyball player;
 Andrzej Szewiński – a former professional volleyball player, sport activist and politician;
 Krzysztof Szramiak – a Polish weightlifter.

References

External links

 

Universities and colleges in Poland
1971 establishments in Poland
Culture in Częstochowa
Teachers colleges in Poland